Bommukutty Ammavukku (For Bommukutty) is a Tamil-language drama aired on Star Vijay. It was started on 3 February 2020 and ended on 5 December 2020 with 156 episodes. It is a remake of the Bengali language series Maa....Tomay Chara Ghum Ashena, which aired on Star Jalsha. The show stars Rethva, Rashmitha and Kiran.

Plot
It is the story of a mother, Meera and her daughter, Aarthi. When young, Aarthi gets kidnapped which leads to Meera getting separated from her. For years, Aarthi is raised as "Bommi" by a female-kidnapper. Circumstances soon lead to Bommi and Meera once again meeting after several years. From then, the story is completely based on how Bommi once again accepts Meera in her life.

Cast

Main 
 Rethva Isvar as Aarthi "Bommi" Prakash
 Roja Rashmita as Meera Prakash 
 Kiran Konda as Prakash Laxman 
 Sridevi Ashok as Rathna

Recurring 
 Shabnam as Anu 
 Surendar KPY as Srini
 Shruthi Shanmugapriya as Prabha Deva  
 Padmini Chandrasekaran as Pratima Laxman
 Raj kumar Manohaaran as Deva
 Praveen Nandagopal as Gowtham
 Neepa as Veni 
 N.P Aadiv as Aadhi 
 Vaishali Thaniga as Swapna

Adaptations

References

External links

Star Vijay original programming
Tamil-language children's television series
2020 Tamil-language television series debuts
Tamil-language television shows
Tamil-language television series based on Bengali-languages television series
2020 Tamil-language television series endings